Boxing Alley is a boxing gym located in Auckland, New Zealand.

The gym is known for training many professional athletes and celebrities in boxing, most notably former rugby league footballer and professional boxer, Monty Betham. It now caters to many boxing fitness enthusiasts.

Charity work 

Boxing Alley has helped raise funds for various charity organisations such as Blue Dragon Children’s Foundation, Kiwis for kiwi, Auckland Women's Refuge and Monty Betham's Steps for Life Foundation.

In 2017, Boxing Alley formed their own charity foundation called Wood For The Trees alongside Moa Brewing Company and Auckland Harley-Davidson. The foundation’s mission is to help New Zealanders suffering from mental illness by providing funding to grassroots organisations.

Television appearances 

In 2013, an episode of The X Factor (New Zealand series 1) was filmed at Boxing Alley.

In 2018, in the seventh episode of Project Runway New Zealand (season 1), a segment was filmed at Boxing Alley featuring a challenge for the contestants. The segment also featured host and Victoria's Secret model, Georgia Fowler displaying her boxing skills with mentor Andreas Mikellis.

Notable athletes 

 Joseph Parker, boxer
 Sonny Bill Williams, professional boxer, rugby league and rugby union footballer
 Dustin Martin, Australian rules footballer
 Liam Messam, rugby union footballer and professional boxer
Rose Keddell, field hockey player
 Sugar Ray Leonard, former boxer
Jonah Lomu, former rugby union footballer
 Kali Meehan, former boxer
 Willis Meehan, boxer and rugby league footballer
 Anthony Mundine, former boxer
 Jeff Horn, boxer
 Brian Minto, former boxer
 Dan Carter, rugby union footballer
 Piri Weepu, former rugby union footballer
DJ Forbes, former rugby union footballer
Akira Ioane, rugby union footballer
Ma'a Nonu, rugby union footballer
 Jerome Kaino, rugby union footballer
 Manu Vatuvei, rugby league footballer and boxer
Konrad Hurrell, rugby league footballer
Roger Tuivasa-Sheck, rugby league footballer
Krystal Forgesson, hockey player
 Jimmy Spithill, yachtsman
Alexander Ustinov, martial artist
 Brian Minto, former boxer
 Dean Lonergan, former rugby league footballer
Martin Guptill, cricketer
Brendon McCullum, former cricketer
Nathan McCullum, former cricketer
Jesse Ryder, cricketer
Wendell Sailor, former rugby league and rugby union footballer
Grant Dalton, sailor
Piri Weepu, former rugby union footballer
Karl Te Nana, former rugby union footballer
Quade Cooper, rugby union footballer
Iafeta Paleaaesina, former rugby league footballer
Jerome Ropati, former rugby league footballer
Wairangi Koopu, former rugby league footballer
Aaron Smith (rugby union)

Notable celebrities 

 Lorde, singer, songwriter and record producer
 Georgia Fowler, high fashion model
 Peter Berg, director, producer, writer, and actor
Calum Von Moger, bodybuilder, YouTuber, and actor
 Hayley Holt, television presenter, former snowboarder and ballroom dancer
Sharyn Casey, television personality and radio host
 Jaime Ridge, fashion blogger
Stan Walker, singer
 Whenua Patuwai, singer
Pua Magasiva, actor
Amber Peebles, television personality
Jimi Jackson, Youtuber
Clint Roberts, radio host
 Lily Taurau, radio host
Nate Nauer, radio host
Nickson Clark, radio host
 Art Green, reality television personality
 Bree Peters, actress
 Lisa O'Loughlin, reality television personality
 Andrew Mulligan, television personality and radio host
James McOnie, television personality
Bryce Casey, radio host
Erin Simpson, television personality
Laura McGoldrick, television personality
Josef Rakich, YouTuber

Notable sports teams 

New Zealand national rugby league team
New Zealand national rugby sevens team

References

External links 
 Official Website

Boxing gyms
Boxing in New Zealand
Sport in Auckland
Boxing venues in New Zealand
Parnell, New Zealand
Sports venues in Auckland